The 95th Indianapolis 500 was held at the Indianapolis Motor Speedway in Speedway, Indiana on Sunday May 29, 2011. The race was part of the 2011 IZOD IndyCar Series season. The track opened for practice on May 14 and time trials were held from May 21 to 22. Alex Tagliani won the pole position, and the race was won by Dan Wheldon. It was his second Indy 500 win after the 2005 race, and the last win of his racing career. It was the first of two Indy victories for car owner Bryan Herta.

Differing strategies from the frontrunners led to one of the wildest finishes in race history. American rookie J. R. Hildebrand of Panther Racing took the lead with two laps to go. As the leaders were cycling through pit stops, Hildebrand was nursing a car very low on fuel. He was attempting to stretch his tank to the finish line and hold on for an unexpected victory. It would have been the first Indy 500 win for Panther Racing, after three consecutive runner-up finishes, and two series championships. On the final turn of the final lap, Hildebrand went high to pass the slow car of Charlie Kimball. He drifted wide and crashed into the outside wall. As his wrecked car coasted down the front straight, Wheldon slipped by in the final 1,000 feet to take the victory. Hildebrand slid across the finish line to finish second. It was the second and most recent Indianapolis 500 to date that ended in a last lap pass after the 2006 race, and the only time to date that the race winner led only the final lap.

Four months later, Wheldon was killed in a crash in the IZOD IndyCar World Championship at Las Vegas Motor Speedway, driving the car Tagliani had qualified on the pole in.

The race was the culmination of the three-year-long Centennial era, celebrating the 100th anniversary of the opening of the track (1909) and the 100th anniversary of the inaugural race in 1911. Throughout May, the race was advertised as the 100th Anniversary Indianapolis 500 and the Centennial Indianapolis 500. Since the race was suspended during World War I and World War II, the 100th running of the 500 would not be held until 2016.

Event news

On February 21, the Speedway announced the start time for the race would be 12 noon EDT (UTC−04), one hour earlier that it had been scheduled from 2006 to 2010.
The 100th anniversary Indy 500 Celebration of Automobiles was held the weekend of opening day. It was a classic/antique car show and contest featuring automobiles linked to race and to the city of Indianapolis from 1911 to 1961.
Staind headlined the annual Carb Day concert on Friday May 27, with special guest Papa Roach.
On April 5, Donald Trump was named the driver of the Chevrolet Camaro SS pace car. However, after mounting criticism of Trump, and a Facebook campaign to oust him from the position, he announced he was stepping down from the honor due to business and time constraints. He was replaced by four-time Indianapolis 500 winner A. J. Foyt.
On the morning of the race, a special auto stunt was performed in the infield. For "IZOD Presents Hot Wheels Fearless at the 500", a mystery stunt driver (later to be revealed as Tanner Foust) from Team Hot Wheels sped down a 90-foot ramp, suspended on a 10-story high door and jumped across the track's infield inside the fourth turn.
The national anthem was performed by Seal and Kelly Clarkson, accompanied by David Foster on piano.
All of the 269 living Indy 500 veteran drivers were invited to attend the race. At least 161 attended during race weekend (including the 28 veteran drivers that qualified for the race) and upwards of 175 attended throughout the entire month of May. A total of 21 of the 27 living winners of the Indianapolis 500 attended the race. Those in attendance included:
Dario Franchitti, Hélio Castroneves, Scott Dixon, Dan Wheldon, and Buddy Rice who drove in the race
A. J. Foyt, Bobby Rahal, Rick Mears, Arie Luyendyk, and Mario Andretti who were team owners or had team-related duties
Johnny Rutherford and Al Unser Jr. who worked as officials
Eddie Cheever and Kenny Brack who worked in broadcasting
Gil de Ferran, Buddy Lazier, Emerson Fittipaldi, Tom Sneva, Bobby Unser, Al Unser, and Parnelli Jones also attended, taking part in various special pre-race activities.
Danny Sullivan made an appearance at the track during May but had to leave prior to race day due to a previous commitment.
Those not attending included Juan Pablo Montoya, who was at Charlotte for the Coca-Cola 600, Sam Hornish Jr., who was also in Charlotte for the Nationwide Series race; Jim Rathmann, who was in poor health and could not travel; Gordon Johncock and Jacques Villeneuve.
In the days leading up to the race, a special list entitled The Greatest 33 was compiled from a panel of experts and fan voting, to establish the best drivers of the first century of the event.

Rule changes
For the first time, double-file restarts were used. At the conclusion of yellow caution periods, the pace car would pull off in turn one, and the field would align in rows of two down the backstretch. The race leader paced the restart, and the entrance to turn four was the designated restart zone. Passing prior to the start/finish line was allowed if the green flag was waving, except on the first lap.
The Honda overtake assist system ("Push-to-pass") was utilized. Each car was permitted 15 presses (18 seconds in duration) with a 10-second recharge time.

Schedule

Other events

May 7 – Hot-air balloon festival / Emerging Technologies Day
May 13 – Freedom 100 testing
May 14 – 100th Anniversary Indy 500 Celebration of Automobiles
May 26 – Freedom 100 practice and time trials
May 27 – Freedom 100 race, Carb Day concert
May 28 – Public Drivers Meeting, Memorabilia Show, Autograph sessions, 500 Festival Parade

Entry list
See Team and driver chart for more information

On April 15, 2011, the Official Entry List was released, featuring 83 cars for 42 entries. As of April 15, thirty-five car/driver combinations had been announced. On May 9, a revised version of the entry list was released. The entry from China Racing was withdrawn. The final list includes 79 cars for 41 entries.

Confirmed former winners entered include Dario Franchitti, Hélio Castroneves, Scott Dixon, Dan Wheldon, and Buddy Rice.

Rookie orientation

Pre-Indy oval testing
Since the Indy 500 was the first oval race of the 2011 season, per IndyCar regulations, rookies who have not competed on an oval were required to take part in Pre-Indy Oval testing. Scott Speed and Ho-Pin Tung, along with Wade Cunningham (who didn't race Indy but participated at Texas) completed the test at Chicagoland Speedway on May 9. Speed was legally exempt from this test because of previous high-speed oval experience in ARCA and NASCAR, but chose to test with his teammate to learn the car.

Thursday, May 12 – Rookie Orientation Program
Weather: , overcast
Practice summary: Seven rookies participated in the rookie orientation program. For 2011, the session was open to rookies only in order to pass the four-part rookie test. There would not be any refresher tests (phases three and four) for part-time veteran drivers as had been in years past. The drivers included: J. R. Hildebrand, James Hinchcliffe, James Jakes, Charlie Kimball, Ho-Pin Tung, Pippa Mann and Scott Speed. Six drivers completed all four phases, while Jakes completed three. Jakes can complete the fourth and final phase at any time prior to time trials on May 21. J. R. Hildebrand (221.533 mph) turned the fastest lap of the day, and no incidents were reported. An eighth Indy 500 rookie is entered, Jay Howard, who is an IndyCar Series veteran (four starts in 2010). He failed to qualify for the Indy 500 in 2010, however since he passed all four phases of the rookie test, and has other oval experience from 2010, he was exempted from participating.

Practice

Saturday, May 14 – Opening Day
Weather: , overcast/ rain
Practice summary: On opening day, 32 cars took to the track, completing 669 laps with no incidents reported. Ed Carpenter led the speed chart at 224.786 mph. Around 3 p.m., rain halted the session, but the track dried, and practice resumed for a short time. At 5:30 p.m., rain returned and the session came to a close.

Sunday, May 15
Weather: , rain
Practice summary: Rain washed out practice for the entire day.

Monday, May 16
Weather: , partly cloudy/ overcast
Practice summary: In the first full practice for the 2011 Indianapolis 500 (1,379 total laps run), Alex Tagliani of Sam Schmidt Motorsports ran the fastest lap of the day, and of the month so far, at 225.878.  The top three rounded out with former winner Scott Dixon coming in second and Graham Rahal finishing third on the day. A total of 39 drivers took to the track, on a cool, windy afternoon. No incidents were reported.

Tuesday, May 17
Weather: , overcast/ rain
Practice summary: Cold temperatures delayed the start of practice until 1:12 p.m. Firestone requires the ambient and track temperature to be over 50 °F before cars are allowed to enter the track. Only two drivers (teammates Marco Andretti and Mike Conway) managed to take laps, and few teams left the garage area. Lingering moisture kept the yellow light on most of the afternoon, and the track closed officially for the day at 4:05 p.m.

Wednesday, May 18
Weather: , overcast/ rain
Practice summary: Rain washed out practice for the entire day.

Thursday, May 19
Weather: , partly cloudy
Practice summary: After two consecutive rainouts (and three overall), the cars took to the track for a full day of practice. At 12:25 p.m., Simona de Silvestro's car lost control in the north chute after leaking fluid, causing her to spin and flip up into the catch fence. The car came to a rest upside-down, with flames coming from the sides, but she climbed from the car and walked to the safety truck. She was transported to Methodist Hospital with second degree burns on her right hand.  Following the accident, practice resumed uninterrupted for the rest of the day with Will Power taking the top position, putting up the fastest speed of the month to date.  Power was followed by Alex Tagliani and teammate Ryan Briscoe in the top speed charts.

Friday, May 20 – Fast Friday
Weather: , sunny/ partly cloudy
Practice summary: Fast Friday saw the second consecutive day of full practice.  Alex Tagliani was atop the leader board for most of the day, like many of the practice sessions before, breaking the record speed during the month at over 228 MPH.  However, later in the day, three-time Indianapolis 500 winner Hélio Castroneves took to the top five in practice for the first time this month, running a best 228.611 MPH.  Castroneves stayed in first position for the rest of the day with Tagliani finishing second, who has finished in the top three on all three full practices of the year.  The 2008 Indianapolis 500 winner, Scott Dixon finished third on the day with a speed over 228 MPH.

Late in the day, reports surfaced that Scott Speed had quit Dragon Racing, after having trouble getting up to speed. The rumor was denied.

Time Trials

Saturday May 21 – Pole Day
Weather: , partly cloudy/ periodic rain

Practice
Practice summary: The final practice before Pole Day commenced at 8:00 AM EDT with the first group taking the track for 30 minutes of practice.  In the first session, Ryan Briscoe crashed his car coming out on turn two and was forced to practice the rest of the day with his back-up car.  After the green flag came back out there were no more interruptions during the practice with the second group finishing their 30 minutes of practice and the remainder of the time given to all the cars for practice.  After the two hours session, it was Alex Tagliani who held the top position, with Buddy Rice making his first appearance in the "fast five", and Will Power rounding out the top three.

Qualifying

First segment summary: The first segment was scheduled from 11 a.m. until 4 p.m. All drivers in the qualifying order were guaranteed at least one opportunity to make a qualifying attempt. The top 24 would make up the provisional starting field. The top nine would advance to the pole position "shootout." Alex Tagliani set the pace early, with a run of 226.954 mph. Other drivers putting in top 9 speeds included Dan Wheldon, Townsend Bell, and Will Power. The day was headlined by several part-time IndyCar teams, while several full-time contenders struggled mightily. Penske failed to get all three of their cars in the top 9; after his morning practice crash, Ryan Briscoe failed to make the top 24. Hélio Castroneves, trying to become the first driver to win three consecutive Indy poles, missed the top 9. All five cars of Andretti Autosport struggled, with John Andretti the only driver to crack the top 24. Ed Carpenter was one of the final drivers to make an attempt, and qualified with an impressive 226.171 mph, good enough for 6th fastest for Sarah Fisher Racing. After being burned in a crash on Thursday, Simona de Silvestro made three qualifying attempts, and on her third attempt, managed to qualify 24th. The only crash of the session was by Ho-Pin Tung, who wrecked on his final lap and suffered a concussion. A short rain shower ended the session about 25 minutes early.
Fast Nine Shootout summary: Rain delayed the start of the Fast Nine "shootout,"  therefore each of the nine participants were allowed only one attempt at the pole position. The top nine drivers from the earlier segment took to the track in reverse order of speed. Oriol Servià set the pace early with a run of 227.168 mph. Dario Franchitti was running fast enough to clinch a front row position, but he ran out of fuel on the final lap and dropped to ninth. Scott Dixon was the second to last driver to make an attempt. He took over the provisional pole position from Servià, and he himself ran out of fuel in the last few seconds of his run. Alex Tagliani was the final driver to go out. His run of 227.472 mph secured the pole position for Sam Schmidt Motorsports.

Sunday May 22 – Bump Day
Weather:

Practice
Practice summary: Patrick Carpentier took over for Scott Speed in the Dragon Racing entry, and took several shake down laps in the morning session. However, his effort ended when he crashed in turn 1. Around noon, Dragon Racing announced they were withdrawing, and would not attempt to qualify. Charlie Kimball topped the speed chart with a lap of 226.822 mph.

Qualifying
Bump Day summary – First segment: Qualifying began at noon, with thunderstorms approaching. Only two cars (Ana Beatriz and Graham Rahal) made it onto the track before heavy rains fell at the track. Track crews dried the racing surface, and the track re-opened for qualifying at 2:30 p.m.
Second segment: A hectic period of qualifying saw the field filled to 33 cars, and bumping began. Paul Tracy took to the track, with weather once again threatening. He completed his run in light misty rain, and bumped his way into the field with the fastest run of the day. Danica Patrick was the next car in line at 3:15 p.m., and the only car that had not yet made an attempt Sunday. However, the rain returned, and halted track activity. There was considerable concern that Patrick may not get an opportunity to qualify, if the rain continued the remainder of the day.
Third segment: Crews dried the track, and it re-opened at 4:45 p.m. Danica Patrick was the first car out, and bumped her way in comfortably. The rest of the Andretti Autosport team, however, was struggling with speed. Mike Conway made three attempts, and was too slow to qualify. In the final fifteen minutes, Marco Andretti was on the bubble, and his teammate Ryan Hunter-Reay was the second slowest. Alex Lloyd took to track, and bumped out Marco Andretti in the final five minutes. Andretti hurried to get back in the qualifying line, but was beaten by James Jakes. Jakes was waved off after two slow laps, which gave Andretti one final chance to bump his way back in. With 55 seconds left before the 6 o'clock gun, Andretti pulled away from the pits. His qualifying run of 224.628 mph bumped Ryan Hunter-Reay from the field.

Carb Day

Indianapolis 500 Final Practice – Friday May 27
Weather: , partly cloudy
Practice summary: The final practice before the 2011 Indianapolis 500 saw all 33 qualified cars take to the track during the hour.  Former winner Scott Dixon saw the fastest time of the session while pole-sitter, Alex Tagliani, who had been very fast for most of the month, came into second with a lap speed of 224.739 MPH.  Former winner Dario Franchitti closed out the top three for the day, a day when over 1,000 laps were run by all cars in the preparation for the race.

Pit Stop Challenge

Source:

Starting grid
 = Former Indianapolis 500 winner;  = Indianapolis 500 rookie

Post-qualifying changes
1 On Monday, May 23, Andretti Autosport and A. J. Foyt Enterprises reached an agreement for Ryan Hunter-Reay to replace Bruno Junqueira as driver of the #41 car. Per race rules, the car, which had originally qualified for the 19th starting position, was moved to the end of the field.

Failed to qualify

Race

Summary

First half
The 95th running of the Indianapolis 500 began at 12:00 PM EDT on a hot, muggy day, shortly after the traditional pre-race ceremonies of the invocation, national anthem, and the singing Back Home Again in Indiana by Jim Nabors.  Mari Hulman George gave the starting command around 12:05 PM, as the cars took two parade laps and one pace lap, led by four-time Indianapolis 500 winner A. J. Foyt, who was driving the pace car.  The green flag came out to see Scott Dixon pass by pole-sitter Alex Tagliani to take the early lead in the race.  The first 20 laps of the race saw a relatively smooth pace set in.  Unlike past years there was no accident in the first two laps, with the first caution coming out on Lap 18 when Takuma Sato made contact with the wall.  During the first caution period many team made pit-stops including Will Power who left the pit area and drove a lap without a left-rear tire, which all but eliminated the IndyCar points leader from having an opportunity to win the race.

Shortly following the green flag restart (which was changed to a two-car abreast start during the drivers meetings) Sato's teammate, E. J. Viso was turned heading into turn 1 by James Hinchcliffe and was the next driver to make contact with the wall and eliminate himself from the race. Following the cleanup and restart after Viso's crash saw the field taking shape and aligning themselves for the long 400+ miles remaining.  Simona de Silvestro, who was burned in a crash earlier in the month, was not able to pick up speed in her back-up car and quickly fell from 23rd position, to last.  On lap 44, it was clear that the car would not be able to keep up with the field, she was called into the pits and her day was over.

Defending winner Dario Franchitti, along with Scott Dixon, Alex Tagliani, and Oriol Servià all began to take their places at the top of the field with each of them leading more than 10 laps in the race respectively.  Later accidents occurred with rookies Jay Howard and James Hinchcliffe. Howard lost a right-rear wheel on lap 61, while Hinchcliffe slid high in turn 3 and bounced off the wall at the halfway mark.

Second half
Following James Hinchcliffe's crash on lap 101, the green flag remained out for over 40 laps as many different drivers shared the lead and got in position for the shootout in the final 10.  On lap 148, it was the pole-sitter Alex Tagliani who would be called into pit lane after making slight contact with the wall.  Tagliani, who had not had a good day, started in first, fell all the way down to 12th before the crash, was finished for the day, with his final finish position being 28th.  One of the few multi-car crashes of the day occurred on lap 158 between Ryan Briscoe and Townsend Bell.  Up to that point in the day, Team Penske had been running slow and really did not have a good shot at any of their drivers winning the race, and with the crash and elimination of Ryan Briscoe all hope seemed gone as Hélio Castroneves and Will Power were both down due to bad pit stops and slow cars.  With no more lengthy cautions the remainder of the race it turned into a fight for the lead as the laps dwindled down.

As the race prepared to go back to green on lap 164, a handful of drivers ducked into the pit area to top off their fuel, in hopes of going the distance without another pit stop. Dario Franchitti and J. R. Hildebrand were among those who gave up their track position, and topped off their fuel.

For the first time in his Indy career, Graham Rahal took the lead of the race and held it for six laps. However, he lost a battle to Scott Dixon and was forced to a pit stop which dropped out of the top five. However, he was able to finish the race in third place.  Tony Kanaan also saw his flirt with Indy glory as he made his way all from the middle of the pack to second place at one point, but was forced as well to drop on a pit stop with less than 20 laps to go. As the race came to down to its final 15 laps, it was still Scott Dixon and Dario Franchitti, two Chip Ganassi Racing cars and former winners, who looked like they would win the race. However, late in the race after a series of pit stops by most in the lead, it was an unlikely Bertrand Baguette who would lead the race as the action came to it climax. Baguette was expected to pit again but as the laps dwindled down and he did not come in, it became increasingly likely that this new face would win the race.

The final 10 laps became a battle between Baguette, Franchitti, and rookie J. R. Hildebrand (all of whom were all trying to stretch their fuel to the finish), as well as Dixon and Dan Wheldon behind but good to the finish having recently pitted.  With three laps to go, Baguette pitted for fuel and Franchitti continued to slow to conserve fuel. This gave the lead to Hildebrand while Franchitti continued to fade, falling behind Dixon and the charging Wheldon. As the field was given the white flag, it seemed all but certain a rookie would win the 500 for the first time since Castroneves won it in 2001. Hildebrand moved his way down into the north short chute and down into turn four. Coming in on the front stretch, Hildebrand went high to avoid the slower car of Charlie Kimball, who was on the inside line, and collided with the wall.  Without steering and on only three wheels, the car slid down the frontstretch towards the finish line. Dan Wheldon, who was second, skirted by in the final 1,000 feet, and crossed the line to win the race. Hildebrand continued to slide, and crossed the finish line in second.

Post-race

Dan Wheldon became the 18th person to win two or more Indianapolis 500's, his first coming in 2005. The 200th lap was the only one he led in the race, breaking Joe Dawson's 99-year-old record for the fewest laps led by an Indy winner. As he took to victory lane, he celebrated with the traditional ceremonies of the wreath, glass of milk, and the presentation of the Borg Warner Trophy.  As the celebration was occurring, his former team Panther Racing considered filing for a review, stating that Wheldon made an illegal pass during the yellow on Hildebrand's car.  In the end, video showed that the yellow did not come out until after Wheldon had passed, and even if it would have come out before the pass, the president of competition ruled that Hildebrand's car was a "wounded car", and was therefore allowed to be passed in the race.

Wheldon's average speed of 170.265 mph was the fourth-fastest Indy 500 in history, and was the first Indy 500 completed in less than three hours since Juan Pablo Montoya won in 2000.

Results

Box score
All cars utilized Dallara chassis, Honda engines, and Firestone Firehawk tires.

Note: Unofficially Oriol Servià finished 5th, 8.8757 seconds behind the leader, with Scott Dixon placing 6th. When the official results were posted, it was determined that Servia passed Dixon on the final lap while the yellow caution light was illuminated. Officials re-instated Dixon to 5th, and dropped Servia to 6th in the final standings.
Note: After qualifying had concluded, Bruno Junqueira was replaced by Ryan Hunter-Reay, who did not qualify for the 500. Junqueira received full qualifying points for a 19th place qualification.
Note: This was the final Indianapolis 500 for John Andretti. On January 30, 2020, he died after a lengthy battle with colon cancer.
Note: This was also Dan Wheldon's final Indianapolis 500 as he would be killed driving in what was to be the season finale IndyCar race in Las Vegas, Nevada, on October 16, 2011.

Race statistics
The race had 23 lead changes among 10 drivers.

Awards

Race winner Dan Wheldon received $2,567,255 in cash prizes and designated awards.

Typically, the presentation of the Borg-Warner Trophy replicas ("Baby Borg") for the driver and owner takes place in January in Detroit during the North American International Auto Show, but Wheldon was killed at Las Vegas in October.  Car owners Bryan Herta and Steve Newey, along with Wheldon's widow Susie, were presented in Detroit with their trophies.

The Indianapolis 500-winning car, Dallara IR3007, was the seventh chassis made by Dallara Automobili from the 2003 specifications.  Originally a Panther Racing car, it was sold to Adrian Fernandez and later Marty Roth, before FAZZT bought the car in 2010, which became Sam Schmidt Motorsports' car in 2011 when it was used to win the Indianapolis 500.  It was raced the next race at Texas Motor Speedway as a Sam Schmidt Motorsports #99 for Wade Cunningham, who crashed it in the first of the Twin 275 km races.  The car has been rebuilt and restored in 2011 Indianapolis 500 condition as part of a Wheldon tribute.  (Andretti Autosport owns the other Wheldon winner, and is restoring that car too in 2005 Indianapolis 500 race-winning trim.)

Broadcasting

Television
The race was televised in high definition in the United States on ABC, the 47th consecutive year on that network. Marty Reid served as anchor. The telecast utilized the Side-by-Side format for commercial breaks. In the Indianapolis market, the live broadcast was blacked out on WRTV, and shown same-day tape delay in prime time. In some markets in northern Indiana, the final 15 laps of the race were not shown due to a weather bulletin.

The race received a 4.3 overnight rating on ABC, up 7% over 2010. The top local markets included Indianapolis (14.5), Dayton (10.5), and Fort Myers/Naples (8.5). The final rating was 4.0 with 6.711 million viewers, up 11% in ratings and 16% in viewership compared to 2010.

Time trials and Carb Day were covered live in the United States on Versus. The announcing team consisted of Bob Jenkins, Jon Beekhuis and Wally Dallenbach Jr. Pit reporters included Lindy Thackston, Marty Snider, and Kevin Lee. Robin Miller serves as analyst and "insider."

Daily practice was streamed live over the internet.

Radio
The race was broadcast on radio by the IMS Radio Network. Mike King served as anchor. The broadcast reached approximately 400 affiliates, as well as AFN, the LeSEA broadcasting network, and World Harvest Radio. The broadcast was carried on XM channel 145 and on Sirius channel 212 through the "Best of XM" package.

After eliminating the position for 2010, the turn one location was brought back for the broadcast. Jerry Baker reprised his role in turn 1. The position was brought back in response to the league adopting double-wide restarts. Kenny Brack returned as "driver expert," joining the booth in-progress after participating in various pre-race festivities.

WFNI broadcast nightly from the track with Trackside with Curt Cavin and Kevin Lee, followed by Donald Davidson's The Talk of Gasoline Alley.

In 2010, drivers from the starting field were used to recite the famous out-cue "Stay tuned for the greatest spectacle in racing." For 2011, in celebration of the Centennial Era, the out-cues for each commercial break were recordings of previous renditions by the former "Voices of the 500." Each commercial break would feature a different chief announcer, rotating through Sid Collins, Paul Page, Lou Palmer, Bob Jenkins, and Mike King. This format was also used in 2009.

See also
2011 IndyCar Series season

References

External links

Indianapolis Motor Speedway – Official Site
IndyCar – Official Site
IndyCar Results Page

Indianapolis 500 races
Indianapolis 500
Indianapolis 500
Indianapolis 500
Indianapolis 500